A festoon (from French feston, Italian festone, from a Late Latin festo, originally a festal garland, Latin festum, feast) is a wreath or garland hanging from two points, and in architecture typically a carved ornament depicting conventional arrangement of flowers, foliage or fruit bound together and suspended by ribbons. The motif is sometimes known as a swag when depicting fabric or linen.

In modern English the verb forms, especially "festooned with", are often used very loosely or figuratively to mean having any type of fancy decoration or covering.

Origins and design
Its origin is probably due to the representation in stone of the garlands of natural flowers, etc., which were hung up over an entrance doorway on fête days, or suspended around an altar.

The design was largely employed both by the Ancient Greeks and Romans and formed the principal decoration of altars, friezes and panels. The ends of the ribbons are sometimes formed into bows or twisted curves; when in addition a group of foliage or flowers is suspended, it is called a drop or margent.

The motif was later used in Neoclassical architecture and decorative arts, especially ceramics and the work of silversmiths. Variations on the exact design are plentiful; for example, the ribbons can be suspended either from a decorated knot, or held in the mouths of lions, or suspended across the tops of bucrania as in the Temple of Vesta at Tivoli.

Gallery

See also
 Tinsel
 Ornament
 Classical architecture
 Neoclassical architecture
Garland bearers

References

Attribution:

Further reading

External links

Architectural elements
Ornaments (architecture)